Cecil Park may refer to:

 Cecil Park, New South Wales, a suburb of Sydney
 Cecil Park (British Army officer) (1885–1913)